James Marshall Campbell (1895-1977) was dean of the college of arts and sciences at The Catholic University of America. Campbell was a classical scholar, and a member of the department of Greek and Latin. He was on the faculty of the Catholic University from 1945-1966.

Selected publications
The influence of the second sophistic on the style of the sermons of St. Basil the Great, Catholic University of America, Washington D.C., 1922. (Patristic Studies Vol. 2) 
The Greek fathers, Longmans, Green, London, 1929.
The Confessions of St. Augustine: Books I-IX (Selections), Prentice-Hall, New York, 1931. (Introduction, notes and vocabulary, with Martin R.P. McGuire) (Reprinted by Bolchazy-Carducci Publishers, 1984, 2007).
A Concordance of Prudentius, Mediaeval Academy of America, Cambridge: Mass., 1932. (With Roy Joseph Deferrari)

References 

1895 births
1977 deaths
American classical scholars
Catholic University of America School of Arts and Sciences faculty